Howard West (September 24, 1931 – December 3, 2015) was an American talent agent and TV producer, best known for his work with long-term partner George Shapiro, in producing and managing Jerry Seinfeld.

Together with his childhood friend from the Bronx, George Shapiro, he was a partner in Shapiro/West and Associates.

He died of a stroke in Los Angeles, aged 84. His life was remembered at an event organized by his daughter, Dayna West, described in some detail in an article in The Washington Post.

References

1931 births
2015 deaths
Television producers from New York City
People from the Bronx